The Mădărașul Mare is a right tributary of the river Olt in Romania. It discharges into the Olt in the village Mădăraș.

References

Rivers of Romania
Rivers of Harghita County